Jacques Geus (22 February 1920 – 13 July 1991) was a Belgian racing cyclist. He finished 27th in the 1949 Tour de France.

References

External links
 

1920 births
1991 deaths
Belgian male cyclists
Cyclists from Brussels
20th-century Belgian people